Darryl Lee Roberson (born March 3, 1960) is a retired United States Air Force lieutenant general who served as the commander of Air Education and Training Command from July 2015 to November 2017. He previously served as commander of Third Air Force and the 17th Expeditionary Air Force at Ramstein Air Base, Germany.

Roberson is a graduate of the United States Air Force Academy and Euro-NATO Joint Jet pilot training. He has been a Thunderbird air demonstration pilot, a Congressional Fellow on Capitol Hill and has served on the Air Staff and Joint Staff at the Pentagon. He commanded at the squadron and group levels, and served as the Commander 52nd Fighter Wing, Spangdahlem Air Base in Germany, 325th Fighter Wing, Tyndall Air Force Base, Florida, and 455th Air Expeditionary Wing, Bagram, Afghanistan. He flew combat missions in Iraq during operations Desert Storm and Iraqi Freedom as well as in Afghanistan during Operation Enduring Freedom.

Roberson is a command pilot who has around 5,400 flight hours including 869 combat hours. He has flown the F-4, F-15, F-16 and F-22.

Awards and decorations

References

1960 births
Embry–Riddle Aeronautical University alumni
Living people
National War College alumni
Place of birth missing (living people)
Recipients of the Air Force Distinguished Service Medal
Recipients of the Defense Superior Service Medal
Recipients of the Distinguished Flying Cross (United States)
Recipients of the Legion of Merit
United States Air Force Academy alumni
United States Air Force generals
United States Air Force personnel of the Gulf War
United States Air Force personnel of the War in Afghanistan (2001–2021)